Richard Jones (1874–unknown) was an English footballer who played in the Football League for Barnsley and Glossop.

References

1874 births
date of death unknown
English footballers
Association football forwards
English Football League players
Barnsley F.C. players
Glossop North End A.F.C. players